The Monumento Encuentro  refers to two bronze statues seated on a bench in Colonia Tabacalera, Cuauhtémoc, Mexico City. Otherwise known as the bench of Fidel Castro and Che Guevara and the statues of Fidel Castro and Che Guevara, the artwork features sitting statues of Fidel Castro and Che Guevara, major figures of the Cuban Revolution (1953–1959). The monument references the first time both met in 1955 in Tabacalera.

The sculptures were designed by Óscar Ponzanelli in 2017. Upon its inauguration, the monument received negative reception.

Background and history

Fidel Castro and Che Guevara first met in June 1955 in Colonia Tabacalera, in Cuauhtémoc, Mexico City, where both agreed to cooperate in the overthrow of Fulgencio Batista, then dictator and president of Cuba. The statue was inaugurated by Ricardo Monreal on 2 December 2017 behind the San Carlos National Museum, a few blocks from where they met. A few weeks later, the bench was removed as it was placed without authorization of the Committee for Monuments and Artistic Works in Public Spaces (COMAEP). The monument was reinstalled until 17 October 2020.

Reception
Upon its installation, the statue received negative opinions due to the aftermath of the Cuban Revolution. Blogger Tamara De Anda mentioned that it received comparisons to the statue of Heydar Aliyev, which was installed and removed after negative reception due to his background. In 2020, Jorge Triana Tena, a local deputy for the right-wing National Action Party, requested to the Congress of Mexico City their removal as he considered that there was no reason to honor people he described as "murderers, homophobes and racists". Congresspeople from the left-wing National Regeneration Movement party, who held the majority of the congress, rejected the proposal without further discussion. In 2021, Misión Rescate México, a civil society organization, asked to remove the bench as a protest against the political prisoners in Cuba.

Vandalism
Days after its reposition, there was an attempt to steal it. On 22 September 2021, two men poured white paint over both sculptures.

Description
The bronze statues were created by Óscar Ponzanelli and are placed on a bench owned by the borough. The monument weights  and cost around Mex$600,000. Both are seated "in a relaxed manner", Castro holds a cigar in his left hand, while Guevara holds a pipe in his right hand.

De Anda compared the faces of Castro and Guevara to those of Santa Claus and Gerardo Fernández Noroña, respectively.

See also

 2017 in art

References

2017 establishments in Mexico
2018 disestablishments in Mexico
2020 establishments in Mexico
Bronze sculptures in Mexico
Controversies in Mexico
Cultural depictions of Che Guevara
Cultural depictions of Fidel Castro
Outdoor sculptures in Mexico City
Statues in Mexico City
Sculptures of men in Mexico
Vandalized works of art in Mexico